Ceków  is a village , (Russian:Цековь) in the administrative district of Gmina Ceków-Kolonia, within Kalisz County, Greater Poland Voivodeship, in west-central Poland.

References

Villages in Kalisz County